Revolting Prostitutes: The Fight for Sex Workers' Rights is a 2018 book by sex workers Juno Mac and Molly Smith. They analyse the effects of varying sex work policies, arguing for full decriminalisation. The book covers topics including survival sex, migrant sex work, feminist views on sex work, and drug use among sex workers. The authors believe that common criticisms of sex work are more general issues with capitalism. The book received positive critical reception.

Background

The authors Juno Mac and Molly Smith entered the sex work industry around 2010 at the ages of 20. Mac's previous job was a year-long internship at a magazine for £30 per day, while Smith previously worked at a coffee shop. Initially liberal feminists, the pair became involved in sex workers' rights activism, eventually identifying as communists. They were both involved in the Sex Worker Advocacy and Resistance Movement (SWARM); Smith was involved in the Edinburgh charity SCOT-PEP, which advocates for sex work decriminalisation. They met in April 2013 at an activist event in Glasgow. Smith said her activism led her to develop her views relating to other areas including migration, drug criminalisation, and capitalism.

The book was published in November 2018. That month, launch events in Ireland took place in Cork and Dublin. A second edition was published in March 2020.

Synopsis
The book discusses the effects of different sex work policies on the lives of sex workers, including analysis of: decriminalisation in countries like New Zealand; legalisation in places such as the Netherlands; the Nordic model; partial criminalisation in the UK; and full criminalisation in locales including the U.S. Mac and Smith argue for full decriminalisation of all sex work, and suggest legal policies which would provide sex workers with additional labour rights. Using a Marxist feminist and materialist framework, they argue that issues with sex work are not unique to the industry, but are instead issues of labour exploitation under capitalism. The authors hold the perspective that almost all sex work is done out of material necessity. They discuss survival sex as well as groups including disabled people, undocumented migrants, or the LGBTQ community who may have no job options other than sex work.

Mac and Smith criticise anti-prostitution feminism and carceral feminism, a movement advocating lengthier prison sentences and more stringent law enforcement to solve social issues relating to sex. They provide evidence that legal restrictions in some countries have not improved the lives of sex workers, and discuss statistics relating to the Nordic model, in which the purchase of sex, but not the sale of sex, is criminalised. The authors argue that the Nordic model causes clients of sex workers to become more volatile and unsafe, as reliable clients are more discouraged by the threat of arrest. In general, they believe criminalisation causes sex workers to work in more dangerous locations, to hire procurers who may put them at risk, or to be at a higher chance of being extorted by police. They comment that engaging in sex work, or receiving a criminal record for such work, can lead to housing instability or losing custody of one's children.

The book contains examples of experiences by many migrant sex workers and their interactions with law enforcement. It features analysis of the U.S. war on drugs and drug use among sex workers. It also describes the concept of a "deserving client", usually a disabled man who is argued to need sex workers as the only way he can experience physical intimacy. Mac and Smith write that this is an ableist idea, related to the desexualisation of disabled people.

Reception
The first copies of the book had sold out by 29 December, Smith reporting that sales in the first six weeks matched Versos expectations of sales after a year. The book was nominated for the Bread and Roses Award in 2019, a British award which aims to honour the best radical left-wing books of the year. The Chronicle of Higher Education listed the book as one of "The Best Scholarly Books" published in the 2010s, with the reviewer Amia Srinivasan calling it a "thrilling and formidable intervention into contemporary discussions of sex work". The philosopher Tom Whyman, writing in The Guardian, called it "one of the best interdisciplinary political books in recent years".

The book received positive reviews from Real Changes Mike Wold and Wendy Lyon of Irish Legal News. It was also praised in the socialist magazines Monthly Review and Jacobin, by Brit Schulte and Natalie Shure, respectively. Schulte believed that "the necessity of reading Revolting Prostitutes in this political landscape cannot be understated". The writing received positive reception, Srinivasan praising it as "a model of how to write about politics". Lyon found that the "writing is impressive throughout", while Wold said that the authors put forward "a compelling case" for their recommended policy approaches.

The book's factual content was also met with praise. Schulte praised it as "exhaustively researched to foreground the voices and experiences of sex workers" and Lyon found that the "referencing displays a laudable commitment to evidence-based advocacy". Shure found that the book contained "robust economic analysis". Lyon highlighted the chapter on sex trafficking and borders as "particularly impressive".

References

Further reading

External links
 Official website

British books
Prostitution law
Prostitution in the United Kingdom
Sex workers' rights
2018 non-fiction books
Left-wing politics in the United Kingdom
Non-fiction books about prostitution
Verso Books books